William Hervy (died c. 1400) was the member of Parliament for the constituency of Gloucestershire for the parliament of 1386.

References 

Members of the Parliament of England for Gloucestershire
English MPs 1386
Year of birth unknown
1400s deaths
Year of death uncertain